Air Lore is an album by the improvisational trio Air featuring Henry Threadgill, Steve McCall, and Fred Hopkins performing compositions by Jelly Roll Morton and Scott Joplin. It was reissued on compact disc by Bluebird/RCA in 1987 and included in the eight-CD box set, Complete Novus and Columbia Recordings of Henry Threadgill and Air on Mosaic Records.

Reception
The AllMusic review by Thom Jurek awarded the album 4½ stars, stating, "Through it all, this remains the album most Air fans love most, precisely because of all the joy and irreverence in the proceedings, which didn't update the old music, but brought it into focus for the revolutionary improvisational template that it is". Bob Blumenthal in The Rolling Stone Jazz Record Guide said, "if one Air album belongs in every collection it is Air Lore, a 1979 performance of Scott Joplin rags and Jelly Roll Morton tunes that is currently unsurpassed as a statement of historical homage from the perspective of the frontiers". Gary Giddins considers Air Lore "Air's most remarkable achievement" and "a torrid and funny inquiry into ragtime and blues," calling it "Threadgill's key statement on the repertory mania and tradition-mongering that gripped jazz in the '70s and '80s and a forceful refutation of the academicism that too often sucks the life's blood out of classic jazz."

Track listing
 "The Ragtime Dance" (Scott Joplin) – 9:20
 "Buddy Bolden's Blues (Jelly Roll Morton) – 9:30
 "King Porter Stomp" (Jelly Roll Morton) – 3:52
 "Paille Street" (Henry Threadgill) – 2:20
 "Weeping Willow Rag" (Scott Joplin) – 11:31

Personnel
 Henry Threadgill – alto saxophone, tenor saxophone, flute
 Fred Hopkins – double bass
 Steve McCall  – drums, percussion

References

1979 albums
Air (free jazz trio) albums
Albums produced by Michael Cuscuna
Novus Records albums